Donald John Logan Bennet,  (born 1957), known as John Bennet, is a British archaeologist, classicist, and academic, who specialises in the Aegean civilisations. He has been Professor of Aegean Archaeology at the University of Sheffield since 2004, and Director of the British School at Athens since 2015. He previously taught at the University of Cambridge, the University of Wisconsin–Madison and the University of Oxford.

Early life and education
Bennet was born in Singapore and was brought up in Yorkshire, England. He studied the Classical Tripos at the University of Cambridge, graduating with a first class Bachelor of Arts (BA) degree in 1980. He remained at Cambridge to undertake postgraduate research on "The administrative organization of Late Minoan II–IIIB Crete based on archaeological and textual (Linear B) evidence": his supervisor was John F. Cherry. He completed his Doctor of Philosophy (PhD) degree in 1986.

Academic career
Bennet began his academic career as a Junior Research Fellow at Sidney Sussex College, Cambridge from 1983 to 1986. In 1986, after completing his doctorate, he moved to the United States and joined the Department of Classics of the University of Wisconsin–Madison in Madison, Wisconsin. He was a Visiting assistant professor of Classics for the first year, an Assistant Professor of Classics from 1987 to 1991, and achieved tenure as an Associate Professor of Classics from 1991 to 1995. In 1995, he was appointed a professor of Classics.

In 1998, Bennet returned to England and joined the University of Oxford as the Sinclair & Rachel Hood Lecturer in Aegean Prehistory. The lectureship was attached to Keble College, Oxford, and so he was elected a Fellow of the college upon taking up the appointment. In April 2004, he gave the Marett Memorial Lecture at Exeter College, Oxford; this lecture was titled "Archaeologies of Homer".

In January 2004, Bennet was appointed Professor of Aegean Archaeology at the University of Sheffield. He has served as Director of the Sheffield Centre for Aegean Archaeology since 2004, and was Head of Department of Archaeology between 2006 and 2010. On 1 October 2015, he was appointed the Director of the British School at Athens, in succession to Catherine Morgan. In addition to directing the School's operation in Greece, he is also co-editor of the BSA Annual and Editor of its publication series.

Personal life
Bennet is married to Deborah.

Honours
On 19 November 2015, Bennet was elected a Fellow of the Society of Antiquaries of London (FSA).

Selected work

References

 

 
 
 

British archaeologists
Directors of the British School at Athens
20th-century archaeologists
21st-century archaeologists
Mycenaean archaeologists
Minoan archaeologists
Academics of the University of Sheffield
Singaporean emigrants to the United Kingdom
Living people
Alumni of the University of Cambridge
Classical scholars of the University of Wisconsin–Madison
Fellows of Keble College, Oxford
Classical scholars of the University of Cambridge
Classical scholars of the University of Oxford
Fellows of the Society of Antiquaries of London
Archaeologists of the Bronze Age Aegean
1957 births